Tabasco Creek is a creek in Bethel Census Area, Alaska.

References

Rivers of Bethel Census Area, Alaska
Rivers of Alaska
Rivers of Unorganized Borough, Alaska